Otelo Burning is a 2011 South African drama film directed and produced by Sara Blecher. The screenplay was written by James Whyle, Sara Blecher and The Cast Workshop. The film is in Zulu with English subtitles. It stars Jafta Mamabolo (Generations), Thomas Gumede (A Place Called Home), and Tshepang Mohlomi (Izulu Lami).

Plot
It is 1989, and the struggle against apartheid has reached its peak. The story starts when 16-year-old Otelo Buthelezi, his younger brother, Ntwe, and his best friend, New Year, are invited to the beach house where their new friend’s mother is a domestic worker.

Watching Mandla Modise surf, they are taken into a world previously closed to them. It is exactly the opposite of the township where they live – a place under a constant and growing threat from political violence
fuelled by Inkatha hostel dwellers on one side, and United Democratic Front comrades on the other. For the boys, who previously had a deep-seated fear of the sea, "flying on water" comes to represent freedom, and they are sold.

Soon, everyone recognises that Otelo is truly gifted on the water, a surfing star in the making. An older white man, Kurt Struely, approaches the boys, certain of their potential. He invites them to his home to watch some professional surfers on video. He also paints an enticing picture of the life they could have if they learn to master the waves. With practice, Otelo soon outshines his friend, Mandla, whose resentment builds even more when Dezi, New Year’s younger sister, falls for Otelo.

As the boys begin to win competitions, Mandla’s jealousy grows and eventually he betrays his friend. In exchange for money for a new surfboard, he sells Otelo’s brother out as a suspected informer for the apartheid security police.

When Otelo discovers the truth behind his younger brother’s death, he has to make a choice between the money, glamour, girls and superstardom of international surfing and justice for Ntwe. On the day Nelson Mandela steps out of prison for the first time in 27 years, the young boy makes a choice that will change his life.

Cast
The cast is mostly made up of young up-and-coming actors who were integrally involved in the world of the story.

 Jafta Mamabolo as Otelo
 Thomas Gumede as New Year
 Sihle Xaba as Mandla Modise
 Tshepang Mohlomi as Ntwe
 Nolwazi Shange as Dezi
 Kenneth Nkosi as Oscar Buthelezi
 Harriet Manamela as Mother Christmas
 Hamilton Dhlamini as Skhumbuzo
 Motlatsi Mafatsche as Blade

Production
The film was in development for over seven years and came out of an extensive workshop process conducted with a group of children in Lamontville, near Durban.

Filming
Much of the film was shot handheld on location in the South African province of KwaZulu-Natal. Most of the film was shot on a RED camera, provided by Panavision. The surf scenes were filmed on a Canon 5D by Fixer Films from Cape Town.

Music
The film's original score was composed by Alan Lazar and Tiago Correia-Paulo. The following songs also appeared in the film:

 Induna (The Headman) - Shiyani Ngcobo
 March in the Line - Casino
 Mkhozi - Monwa & Sun
 All Night Jive - Zone 3
 Reggae Vibes is Cool - James Phillips
 Ezweni Elihle-Hle - Masibuyele Kujehova
 Zulu
 Straight Forward - The Big Red One
 Hold On - Modern English
 Thugs - The Dynamics
 Hoi Chaklas - Mr. Chacklas
 Dangerous - MM Deluxe
 Who's Worried - The Dynamics
 My Dreams Won't Wait - Zaki Ibrahim
 Sunshine - Zaki Ibrahim
 Cold World - Tumi and Andreena Mill

Reception
The project was taken to the No Borders IFP in New York in September 2009, and was chosen for the IFP Independent Film Narrative Labs in 2011. Otelo Burning was the opening film for the 32nd Durban International Film Festival.

Awards
The film won the awards of Best Dramatic feature and Surfing movie at the 2013 Byron Bay International Film Festival.

References

External links

 
 
 
 Otelo Burning at Nu Metro

South African drama films
2011 films
Best Cinematography Africa Movie Academy Award winners
AMVCA Best Overall Film winners
Films scored by Alan Lazar